Hexameria may refer to:
Hexameria R.Br., a synonym of the plant genus Podochilus
Hexameria Torr. & A.Gray, a synonym of the plant genus Echinocystis